The Duke University Talent Identification Program (commonly referred to as "Duke TIP") was a gifted education program based at Duke University. Founded in 1980 as one of the first pre-collegiate studies programs offered by an American university, the program aimed to identify gifted students in grades four through twelve and provide advanced educational opportunities, as well as social and emotional support.  The Duke TIP program permanently ended in 2020 because of the COVID-19 pandemic.

History 
Duke TIP was founded in 1980 by a grant from the Duke Endowment. At the time, the goal of the program was to identify and provide educational opportunities to help the children reach their full educational potential. The program initially focused on seventh graders, and later expanded to grades four through twelve, allowing the program full reach of middle and high school students.

Due to COVID pandemic disruptions, in 2020 and 2021 the programs were unable to run. As a result the TIP Summer Studies program and the Academic Talent Search were permanently cancelled.  Beginning in 2022, all pre-college students were directed to Duke's Continuing Studies program.

Across its 40 years of operation, the program benefited over 3 million students, with over 100,000 students applying to the program each year.

Facilities and Partnering Universities 
Following the program's inception in 1980, Duke University added additional programming locations. Within Duke University, students could attend at the main university campus in Durham, North Carolina or at the Duke Marine Laboratory in Beaufort, North Carolina. Programs were also offered at:

 Rice University
 Wake Forest University
 Georgia Tech
 Davidson College
 Trinity University
 Austin College
 Rollins College
 Appalachian State University
 Louisiana State University
 The University of Georgia
 Belmont University
 Agnes Scott College
 Eckerd College
 Meredith College
 Southwestern University
 New College of Florida
 Pisgah Astronomical Research Institute

Programs 
TIP offered a variety of programs. There were two talent searches—the 4th–6th Grade Talent Search and the 7th Grade Talent Search—that provided above-grade-level testing, enrichment activities, specialized publications, and other benefits.

There were also in-person and online educational programs available, taking place both during and off the school year, including:

 Summer Studies (grades 7–10)
 Field Studies (grades 9–12)
 CRISIS (grades 5–6)
 eStudies (grades 7–11)
 Scholar Weekends (grades 7–11)
 Academic Adventures (grades 4–6)
 eInvestigators (grades 4–6)

Eligibility 
In most cases, eligibility for TIP's talent searches were determined by grade-level test scores. Students had to score at or above the 95th percentile on national standardized achievement, abilities tests, or state assessments, or 125+ on an IQ test.

Some of TIP's educational programs had additional score requirements. Summer Studies and eStudies both required qualifying scores on the SAT or ACT.

See also
Education Program for Gifted Youth, Stanford University
Center for Talented Youth, Johns Hopkins University

References

External links
 Duke TIP website
 TIP Wiki - website created and run by attendants and alums of TIP's various programs

1980 establishments in the United States
Duke University
Gifted education
United States educational programs